Radio Kansas is a network of public radio stations serving central Kansas.  The network is based at Hutchinson Community College in Hutchinson.  It comprises flagship KHCC-FM (90.1 FM in Hutchinson, also serving Wichita) and two full-time satellites, KHCD (89.5 FM) in Salina and KHCT (90.9 FM) in Great Bend. The three stations air a mix of classical music and American Public Media programming including BBC news.

History
The flagship station, KHCC, was licensed July 14, 1972 and first signed on air September 11, 1972 as an 80-watt student station operated by what was then Hutchinson Junior Community College.  In 1978, HJCC hired its first professional station manager, David Horning, as part of an effort to upgrade the station to an NPR member. On July 1, 1979, KHCC increased power to a full 100,000 watts and joined NPR, becoming Kansas' third full NPR member. This also made Wichita one of the smallest markets with two competing NPR member stations. KHCC brought NPR programming to several Wichita suburbs who, at the time, got only a marginal signal from the market's other NPR member, KMUW; that station would not upgrade to full power until 1987.

KHCD was added on January 28, 1988, followed by KHCT on August 3, 1992. More or less out of necessity, when KHCT signed on, KHCC rebranded itself as "Radio Kansas." Radio Kansas now serves a broadcast area with over one million, with a combined footprint covering most of the densely populated area of central Kansas.

Radio Kansas began broadcasting in the HD Radio format in 2006, one of the first NPR members to do so. In 2012, it signed on three additional HD streams on all three stations. HD2 ("New Grass Valley") is a full-time folk and bluegrass station, HD3 airs contemporary instrumental music ("The Breeze") and HD4 airs jazz ("Radio Kansas Jazz").

References

External links
 Official website

KHCC-FM
NPR member networks